Wadhurst railway station is on the Hastings line in the south of England and serves the town of Wadhurst, East Sussex. It is  down the line from London Charing Cross. The station and all trains serving it are operated by Southeastern.

The station is at the bottom of a fairly steep hill, with the town centre about a mile away at the top. An hourly bus (more frequent at peak times) links the station with the town centre and with the neighbouring villages of Durgates and Ticehurst.

Designed by the architect William Tress, the station was opened in 1851 by the South Eastern Railway. Originally there were sidings and a goods shed, but these have been replaced with a car park.

Unusually, the station features a private entrance to nearby Faircrouch, a large Grade II listed house around 220 yards from the westbound platform.

In 2000 the station buildings and footbridge were given Grade II listed status.

Services 
All services at Wadhurst are operated by Southeastern using  EMUs.

The typical off-peak service in trains per hour is:
 2 tph to London Charing Cross via  (1 semi-fast, 1 stopping)

References

External links 

Railway stations in East Sussex
Former South Eastern Railway (UK) stations
DfT Category D stations
Railway stations in Great Britain opened in 1851
Railway stations served by Southeastern
1851 establishments in England
Grade II listed railway stations
Grade II listed buildings in East Sussex
Wadhurst